Hermann Lang (6 April 1909 – 19 October 1987) was a German racing driver who raced motorcycles, Grand Prix cars, and sports cars.

Prewar racing
Born in Cannstatt near Stuttgart, Baden-Württemberg, Germany, Hermann Lang had to go to work at age fourteen to help support his family following the death of his father. Young Lang found a job as a motorcycle mechanic, eventually buying his own used bike with which he began amateur racing. He won the very first race he entered and before long decided to compete in the sidecar class. At age twenty-two, he won the German sidecar mountain race championship.
 
Lang's big break came when he landed a job at the Mercedes factory where he became part of their Grand Prix motor racing team. He was made head mechanic for the Mercedes-Benz W25A model to be driven by the Italian star Luigi Fagioli who had left Alfa Romeo to create a powerhouse Mercedes factory team that also included Rudolf Caracciola. Following a very successful season in which Fagioli won both the Italian and Spanish Grand Prix, Hermann Lang was given a chance to drive for the Mercedes team. He proved to be most capable on high-speed racetracks, capturing his first win in the 1937 Tripoli Grand Prix at the Mellaha Lake course in Libya which was then the fastest racetrack in the world. Lang dominated the event, winning it for three straight years. That year he won his second major race at the AVUS extravaganza.

In 1938, he won two more races for Mercedes including the prestigious Coppa Ciano at Livorno, Italy. Nevertheless, in spite of Hermann Lang's skills and racing success and his popularity with racing fans, being a part of the Mercedes Silver Arrows team was not easy. Made up of wealthy and aristocratic drivers who looked down on the uneducated, working-class Lang, he was always treated as an outsider. However, in 1939 he earned their grudging respect when he won five of the eight Grand Prix races he started, including victories at the Belgian Grand Prix, the Pau Grand Prix in France, the Swiss Grand Prix and his third consecutive Tripoli Grand Prix. In addition to being a quick driver, Lang was also advantaged in that being a former mechanic, he had a lot of mechanical knowledge of cars and was able to give good technical feedback during testing and races to chief designer Rudolf Uhlenhaut, who was able to develop the Mercedes cars to a greater degree, and Lang's natural feel for the machinery meant that he was able to get set-ups on his cars that made them faster than his rivals' cars. He clocked the fastest lap at the French Grand Prix and was leading the field but engine trouble knocked him out of the race. In 1939, Lang also competed in, and won, the Kahlenberg hillclimbing race in Austria.

1939 championship controversy

In 1939, Lang was declared the champion of the European Championship, but this is unofficial. The season was cut short by World War II and Lang received this title from the German motor racing authority, instead of the official authority AIACR, based in Paris. 
By way of the points at the last attempted race of the season, competitor Hermann Paul Müller was considered the points leader, not Lang.

Postwar racing
 The onset of World War II robbed Lang of his best years but after the war ended, he returned to racing in 1946 without a team, driving a six-year-old BMW to victory in the first post-war race in Germany held at Ruhestein. In 1949 he began sports car racing and then competed in Formula Two racing before joining the Mercedes Grand Prix racing team in Argentina, at the Buenos Aires Grand Prix in 1951. In 1952, at age 43, he teamed up with Fritz Riess to capture the 24 hours of Le Mans. The following year, he published his autobiography titled "Grand Prix Driver," with the Foreword written by the Mercedes team manager, Alfred Neubauer. Published in Germany, it was translated into English by Charles Meisl and brought out in England.

In 1953, Hermann Lang was given a chance to participate in Formula One racing driving for Maserati after one of their team drivers was injured. He raced in two F1 events that year with his best result a fifth-place finish at the Swiss Grand Prix. The following year Mercedes rejoined Grand Prix racing and Lang came back for another F1 season behind the wheel of a Mercedes W196. But at age 45, he had a less than successful campaign that saw him replaced in several races by one of the team's younger drivers. His season and career ended at the 1954 German Grand Prix at Nürburgring when he spun out after ten laps, even though he was running as high as 2nd in front of his teammate Karl Kling. Lang recognized the time had come to retire from racing and he returned to his job at the Mercedes factory.

Racing record

Complete European Championship results
(key) (Races in bold indicate pole position) (Races in italics indicate fastest lap)

Complete Formula One results
(key)

Complete 24 Hours of Le Mans results

References

External links
Grand Prix History , Hermann Lang
Detailed Formula One driving statistics

1909 births
1987 deaths
German racing drivers
German Formula One drivers
Maserati Formula One drivers
Mercedes-Benz Formula One drivers
Mercedes-Benz
Grand Prix drivers
24 Hours of Le Mans drivers
24 Hours of Le Mans winning drivers
Racing drivers from Baden-Württemberg
Sportspeople from Stuttgart
European Championship drivers